The 2002 Primera División season was the 71st season of top-flight football in Chile. It was the second season in which the Apertura and Clausura format was used, and the first since 1997.

Torneo Apertura

Classification stage

Playoff stage

Finals

Top goalscorers

Liguilla Pre-Copa Sudamericana
First Round

Quarterfinals

Semifinals

Torneo Clausura

Classification stage

Playoff stage

Finals

Top goalscorers

Relegation

See also
2002 in Chilean football

References
General

External links

  
Primera División de Chile seasons
Chile
1